Pyramidella corrugata is a species of sea snail, a marine gastropod mollusk in the family Pyramidellidae, the pyrams and their allies.

Description
The length of the shell attains 23 mm.

The elongated shell is slender and turreted. It is white, with small sparse, scattered yellow spots near the suture. The pointed spire is formed of nine or ten slightly convex whorls, the surface of which is covered with longitudinal folds, also convex, very distinct, smooth, numerous, regular, prolonged even to the summit of the whorls, and accompanied with some small, scattered, yellowish spots. Numerous compressed transverse striae are found between the interstices. The suture is linear. The narrow aperture is ovate, elongated, and slightly narrowed at its extremities. It forms at its base a little depression in an oblique siphonal canal. The outer lip is thin and arcuate. The columella is imperforate at its base. iI is slightly arcuated, thin, furnished with three folds, the first more strongly marked than the others, which are a little oblique.

Distribution
This marine species occurs in the following locations:
 Tanzania
 La Réunion.

References

 Lamarck [J.-B. M.] de. (1822). Histoire naturelle des animaux sans vertèbres. Tome sixième, 2me partie. Paris: published by the Author, 232 pp

External links
 To Encyclopedia of Life
 To World Register of Marine Species

Pyramidellidae
Gastropods described in 1822